Hatred (in Persian: بغض; transliterated: boqz) is a 2012 Iranian drama film directed by Reza Dormishian. It is set in Istanbul, Turkey and deals with Iranian youth immigration.

Plot
Jaleh and Hamid are two youngsters from the third generation of Iranian immigrants in Turkey. Their families came to Turkey to have a peaceful life. Two parallel narrations from two different periods of the young characters' lives are presented. One narration is about their first days of meeting and happiness. The other is about the eight crucial hours when they commit a robbery so they can use the money to start a happy life somewhere else. However, as often happens in such cases, they are led in a different direction.

Awards
Camerimage International Film Festival, Bronze Frog Statue Award, Best Cinematography, for Turaj Aslani (director of photography), 2012 
6th Iranian Critics and Film Writers, Best Director Award, for Reza Dormishian, 2014
6th Iranian Critics and Film Writers, Best Editor Award, for Hayedeh Safiyari, 2014
16th Clebratatio of Khaneh Cinema (The Iranian Alliance of Motion Picture Guilds), Best First Film Award, 2014

Nominations 

Revelation Perth International Film Festival, nominated for Audience Choice Award, 2012 
Montréal World Film Festival, nominated for Golden Award, for Reza Dormishian, 2012 
Warsaw International Film Festival, nominated for Grand Prix, for Reza Dormishian, 2012

References

External links
Official trailer
 
Films set in Istanbul
2010s Persian-language films
2010s Turkish-language films
Films about immigration
Iranian multilingual films
Turkish multilingual films
2012 films
2012 multilingual films